Jashn-e-Chiragah is a festival of Lights established by Akbar the Mughals King around 400 years ago. It is a version of Deepavali.

References

Festivals in India